Witwer is a surname. Notable people with the surname include: 

Angela Witwer, American politician
H. C. Witwer (1890–1929), American short-story author
Kenneth Witwer, American biologist
Rob Witwer (born 1971), American politician and lawyer
Sam Witwer (born 1977), American actor, voice actor, and musician